Teratohyla spinosa (common name: spiny Cochran frog) is a species of frog in the family Centrolenidae. It is found in the Pacific lowlands of northern and central Ecuador and western Colombia, northward on the Pacific slopes Panama and Costa Rica, as well as on the Caribbean slopes of Costa Rica, Nicaragua, and Honduras.

Description
Teratohyla spinosa are small, green frogs with large, protuberant eyes. Adult males have an exposed spine at the base of the thumb.

Males call throughout the wet season (May–October) from the low vegetation surrounding small streams. Females lay 18–25 eggs on the underside of vegetation in a single layer of loose jelly. Larvae develop in streams.

Habitat and conservation
It is found along streams in the low vegetation. Its habitat is threatened by deforestation, although the species is not considered threatened in view of its wide distribution and presumed large population.

References

spinosa
Frogs of North America
Frogs of South America
Amphibians of Colombia
Amphibians of Costa Rica
Amphibians of Ecuador
Amphibians of Honduras
Amphibians of Nicaragua
Amphibians of Panama
Least concern biota of North America
Least concern biota of South America
Taxa named by Edward Harrison Taylor
Amphibians described in 1949
Taxonomy articles created by Polbot